is a railway station located in the town of Fukaura, Aomori Prefecture Japan, operated by the East Japan Railway Company (JR East).

Lines

Station layout
Yokoiso Station has one ground-level side platform serving a single bi-directional track. The station is unattended, and has no station building, but only a small waiting room on the platform. The station is managed from Goshogawara Station.

History
Yokoizo Station was opened on December 25, 1954 as a station on the Japan National Railways (JNR). With the privatization of the JNR on April 1, 1987, it came under the operational control of JR East.

Surrounding area

Yokoiso fishing port

See also
 List of Railway Stations in Japan

References

External links

  

Stations of East Japan Railway Company
Railway stations in Aomori Prefecture
Gonō Line
Fukaura, Aomori
Railway stations in Japan opened in 1954